NH 140 may refer to:

 National Highway 140 (India)
 New Hampshire Route 140, United States